Becel is a brand of margarine produced by Dutch company Upfield. In France, it is sold as Fruit D'or and in the United States as Promise.

Name 
The name Becel originates from the initials BCL (Blood Cholesterol-Lowering). When introduced, the makers of Becel claimed to achieve a blood cholesterol lowering effect by modifying the triacylglycerol (TAG) profile of the fat used in the margarine under the idea that an increased level of polyunsaturated fatty acids (PUFA) reduces the blood cholesterol level.

"Pro-active" brand 
More recently, products were introduced under the "Pro-active" sub-brand. These products are based on the effects of plant sterols and sterol esters lowering blood cholesterol. This is achieved by a highly increased resorption of beta-sitosterol and other phytosterols which accumulate especially in the intima of blood vessels and may cause arteriosclerotic plaques. In consequence, consumption of Becel products does not lower the risk for coronary diseases such as arteriosclerosis and therefore does not provide any medical benefits.

In light of supporting evidence from various clinical trials, Becel Pro-activ gained the European Food Safety Authority’s (EFSA) approval for its claim to reduce cholesterol levels. It does not reduce the risk of heart disease and is not claimed to do so by Upfield, although many consumers believe it does.

2010 Academy Awards controversy
In 2009, Becel commissioned Sarah Polley to direct a two-minute short "to inspire women to take better care of that particular vital organ" [the heart]. A week before the short's planned premiere in Canada, a commercial break during the CTV broadcast of the 82nd Academy Awards aired and Polley attracted headlines for taking her name off the film. Polley had understood that the film, titled "The Heart", would be used to promote the Heart and Stroke Foundation of Canada, but was unhappy with the association with Becel. "Regretfully, I am forced to remove my name from the film and disassociate myself from it. I have never actively promoted any corporate brand and cannot do so now." In response, Becel said it was a "founding sponsor" of the Canadian Heart Truth campaign and had commissioned the film "to put heart health on the radar of Canadian women".

References

Former Unilever brands
Upfield (company) brands
Margarine brands